Smith Cove is the name of two American and one Antarctic bodies of water:

Smith Cove (Connecticut)
Smith Cove (Washington)
Smith Cove (South Shetland Islands)